Sabrina Ehsan Porshi (born 30 July 1996) is a Bangladeshi singer. Her career began when she was 2nd runner-up in a music talent hunt show, Channel i "Khude gaan raj", in 2008. Porshi's first song recording was for a movie in 2009 arranged by "Khude Gaan Raj" team.

Early life and music background

Porshi was born on 30 July to a Muslim family in Dhaka, Bangladesh. Her home district is Brahmanbaria.  Porshi lived at Uttara for 14 years. She moved to Cambrian College to study commerce.

In 2007, Porshi took part in a singing competition named "Komol kuri" organized by the government, and became winner in "country song" category. In 2008, Porshi participated in Channel i "Khude gaan raj" Singing Competition, her first on-screen appearance. She became the second runner up.

2008–2010
Porshi started her music career professional when she was in "khude gaan raj" competition in 2008. She did her first playback in 2009.  That was also her first studio recording. In 2009 she started the work of her solo album Porshi. She made the album with 5 music director. The album was finished in April 2010. The label "Laser Vision" released the album in Eid-ul-Fitr 2010.

2011–2012
After the first album, Porshi started to work as a playback singer from 2011. Her first recorded song in 2011 was "Kothao chile na tumi" with Arfin Rumey. On 14 February 2012 Porshi released her second solo album, Porshi 2. She also did playback songs in 2012. In 2012 Porshi announced her band named "Bornomala".

2013–present
In Eid-ul-Fitr she released her third solo album Porshi 3.

Music videos
Her first music video was "Tomari porosh" with Arfin Rumey, from her first album Porshi. This video was directed by Rommo Khan. Then Porshi made another three music videos from her second solo album in 2012. "Khuje khuje", Shudhu tore and Boro Eka "Khuje khuje ft Arfin Rumey" and "Shudhu Tore ft ZooEL Morshed" and "Boro Eka".

In 2013 Porshi made her 5th music video from her album Porshi 3. Porshi and the composer and co-singer of this song Imran acted in this music video.

Solo albums

Filmography

Film

Music

Awards and nominations

References

External links 
 

21st-century Bangladeshi women singers
21st-century Bangladeshi singers
Bangladeshi female models
1996 births
Living people